The New York Savings Bank is a historic bank building in Chelsea, Manhattan, New York City. It was built in 1896 by Robert Henderson Robertson with George Provot, and was added to the National Register of Historic Places on January 7, 2000. The facade and interior were designated a New York City Landmark on June 8, 1988.

From 1992 until 2004, the building was a branch of Central Rug & Carpet Mart owned by the Longwill and Timianko family. In 2005 it became a Balducci's food market. By 2010 it had become a CVS drug store.

Gallery

See also
National Register of Historic Places listings in Manhattan from 14th to 59th Streets

References

External links

 Former New York Savings Bank at flickr
 NY Songlines: 8th Ave.

Neoclassical architecture in New York City
Commercial buildings completed in 1896
Commercial buildings on the National Register of Historic Places in Manhattan
New York City Designated Landmarks in Manhattan
Bank buildings in Manhattan
Bank buildings on the National Register of Historic Places in New York City
14th Street (Manhattan)
Eighth Avenue (Manhattan)